Ardharathiri (Midnight) is a 1969 Indian Telugu-language thriller film written by Aarudhra and directed by P. Sambasiva Rao in his debut. Inspired by the Charlotte Brontë novel Jane Eyre, the film stars Jaggayya and Bharathi. It was released on 12 April 1969 and became a commercial success.

Plot

Cast 
Adapted from The Hindu:
 Jaggayya as Sridhar
 Bharathi as Sarala
 V. Nagayya as Dharmarao
 Mannava Balayya as Prasad
 Ramana Reddy as Panakala Rao
 Raavi Kondala Rao as Keshav
 Radhika as Panakala Rao's daughter
 Kalpana as Rani

Production 
P. Sambasiva Rao's desire to direct a thriller film arose after he read the Charlotte Brontë novel Jane Eyre. He, Aarudhra and Polavarapu Srihari Rao then created the story of the film Ardharathiri, taking inspiration from the novel while new characters and situations were created to suit the tastes of Telugu-speaking audience. As Sambasiva Rao put it, "In evolving the characters of Prasad and Keshav, traces of influence can be found in Emily Brontë's Wuthering Heights". The film marked his directorial debut and was produced by P. Gangadara Rao under Hyderabad Movies. Cinematography was handled by J. Sathyanarayana and editing by S. P. S. Veerappa.

Soundtrack 
The soundtrack was composed by Master Venu. The song "Ee Pilupu Nee Kosame" is based on "Kahin Deep Jale Kahin Dil" from the 1962 Hindi film Bees Saal Baad (1962).

"Ee Pilupu Ni Kosame" - P. Susheela (lyrics: Aarudra)
"Ee Oori Dhanni" - B.R. Latha (lyrics: Kosaraju)
"Egiri Poyina Chilu" - L.R. Eswari , Apparao Nagabhyru (lyrics: Aarudra)
"Kaipekkinche Kammani Reyi" - S. Janaki (lyrics: Dasaradhi)
"Oho Andamantha" - S. P. Balasubrahmanyam, B. R. Latha (lyrics: Aarudra)

Release and reception 
Ardharathiri was released on 12 April 1969, and became a commercial success.

References

External links 
 

1960s Telugu-language films
1969 directorial debut films
1969 films
1969 thriller films
Indian thriller films
Films scored by Master Venu